Pendleton may refer to:

Places
United Kingdom
Pendleton, Lancashire, England
Pendleton, Greater Manchester, England

United States
Pendleton, Indiana
Pendleton, Missouri
Pendleton, New York
Pendleton, Oregon
Pendleton, South Carolina
Pendleton County, Kentucky
Pendleton, Texas
Pendleton County, West Virginia
Marine Corps Base Camp Pendleton, Oceanside, California
Pendleton, Cincinnati, Ohio, a neighborhood

Businesses
Pendleton Whisky, a premium Canadian Whisky imported and bottled by Hood River Distillers in Hood River, Oregon
Pendleton Woolen Mills, Pendleton, Oregon, USA, best known for its Indian blankets and usually-plaid woollen shirts
Pendleton's Lithography, Boston, established by William S. Pendleton (1795–1879) and John B. Pendleton (1798–1866)

Other uses
Pendleton (name)
SS Pendleton, a tanker ship that broke in two off the coast of Chatham, Massachusetts, as depicted in The Finest Hours
Pendleton Civil Service Reform Act, 1883 law of the US Congress establishing the United States Civil Service Commission
Pendleton Correctional Facility, a prison in Pendleton, Indiana
Pendleton Airport, near Ottawa, Canada
Pendleton (band), a punk band from Manchester, England
Pendleton 8, a nickname given to eight soldiers involved in the Hamdania incident
Pendleton Round-Up, a major annual rodeo incorporated in 1911
Pendelton State University, fictional university on the sitcom 3rd Rock from the Sun (note different spelling)
Pendleton University, fictional university in the 1998 slasher horror film Urban Legend